Sylvestre is a surname of French origin. Notable people with the surname include:

Actors
 Cleo Sylvestre (born 1945), English actress
 Simone Sylvestre (1923–2020), French film actress

Singers
 Anne Sylvestre (1934–2020), French singer
 Patrice Sylvestre (born 1973), French singer of Guadeloupe origin, known by the stage name Slaï
 Sergio Sylvestre (born 1990), Italian pop singer

Sports figures
 Alain Sylvestre (born 1979), Canadian kickboxer
 Brian Sylvestre (born 1992), Haitian-American soccer goalkeeper
 Eddy Sylvestre (born 1999), French footballer
 Jérôme Sylvestre (born 1979), Canadian snowboarder
 Jules Sylvestre-Brac (born 1998), French footballer
 Leopold Sylvestre (1911–1972), Canadian speed skater
 Ludovic Sylvestre (born 1984), French footballer
 Noha Sylvestre (born 1997), Swiss footballer
 Patrick Sylvestre (born 1968), Swiss footballer
 Tommy Sylvestre (born 1946), Togo football goalkeeper

Other
 Armand Sylvestre (disambiguation)
 Guy Sylvestre (1918–2010), Canadian literary critic, librarian and civil servant
 Joseph-Noël Sylvestre (1847–1926), French painter
 Liza Sylvestre (born 1983), American visual artist
 Louis Sylvestre (1832–1914), farmer and political figure in Quebec
 Olivier Sylvestre (born 1982), Canadian writer
 René Sylvestre (1962–2021), Haitian jurist and lawyer

See also
 Sylvestre (disambiguation)

French-language surnames